Wise Peak is a small peak (1,580 m) marking the south end of Warren Range in Oates Land. Named by Advisory Committee on Antarctic Names (US-ACAN) for Keith A.J. Wise, biologist working out of the McMurdo Station for five seasons, 1960–61 to 1964–65.

Mountains of Oates Land